Hallis is a surname. Notable people with the surname include:

Adolph Hallis (1896–1987), South African pianist, composer, and teacher
Howard Hallis (born 1971), American artist

See also
Halinen
Hallas
Hollis (name)
Wallis (surname)